Lautner is an Austrian habitational surname, from any of the several places called Lauten. The name may refer to:

Taylor Lautner, American actor, voice actor, model, and martial artist
John Lautner (1911–1994), American architect
Georges Lautner (1926–2013), French film director and screenwriter
Kryštof Lautner, Northern Moravia witch trials